Nadine Ramaroson (May 28, 1958 – August 28, 2011) was a French-born politician in Madagascar.

Birth
The daughter of André Ramaroson and Odette Andriatsalama, she was born Nadine Laura Eugénie Charlotte Ramaroson in Maisons-Alfort, France.

Education
She was educated at the Saint Joseph de Cluny elementary school, at the St. Antoine secondary school in Andravoahangy, at the Lycée Français de Tananarive and the École des Roches in France. She continued her studies at the Glion Institute of Higher Education in Switzerland. She then worked at a hotel in Geneva, in the family business Savonnerie tropicale and later started her own import-export company Madisco.

Ramaroson had been Minister of Population and Social Affairs since 2009.

Death

She drowned in the ocean near Soanierana Ivongo while returning from a festival at Île Sainte-Marie. The boat was apparently overturned by large waves and several people including Ramaroson died. There was a report that a subsequent explosion had prevented a rescue attempt and caused additional deaths.

References 

1958 births
2011 deaths
Deaths by drowning
Deaths due to shipwreck
Women government ministers of Madagascar
People from Maisons-Alfort
French expatriates in Switzerland
Malagasy expatriates in Switzerland
Malagasy politicians
French people of Malagasy descent
Malagasy businesspeople